Elisabeth Bergmann (-Korentschnig) (November 20, 1970) is an Austrian rhythmic gymnast.

Elisabeth Bergmann competed for Austria in the rhythmic gymnastics individual all-around competition at the 1988 Summer Olympics in Seoul. There she was 25th in the preliminary (qualification) round and did not advance to the final.

References

External links 
 Elisabeth Bergmann at Sports-Reference.com

1970 births
Living people
Austrian rhythmic gymnasts
Gymnasts at the 1988 Summer Olympics
Olympic gymnasts of Austria